Lake Waynoka is a census-designated place (CDP) and gated community in Brown County, Ohio, United States, located around a similarly named reservoir between Sardinia and Russellville.  The population was 1,173 at the 2010 census.

Demographics

History 
In 1970, American Realty Service Corporation of Memphis, Tennessee, began the development of Lake Waynoka by buying farm land, damming the headwaters of Straight Creek, a tributary of the Ohio River, and dividing the land into lots roughly one-third of an acre in size. American Realty also created other lake communities.

Over the years, Lake Waynoka has transitioned from a weekend and summer get-away spot to a community of full-time residents with a high rate of continued growth. Migration from Cincinnati and Dayton has helped continue this growth.

Property Owners' Association 
As a gated community, Lake Waynoka maintains its own roads, facilities and maintenance of the lake itself through annual membership fees paid to the controlling organization, Waynoka Property Owners Association, Inc. This body sets the rules and regulations and is composed of nine elected property owners in good standing.

Waynoka Reservoir

References

External links 
Waynoka Property Owners Association

Waynoka
Bodies of water of Brown County, Ohio
Census-designated places in Brown County, Ohio
1970 establishments in Ohio